The San Luis Central Railroad  is a railroad company based in the U.S. state of Colorado. It was founded in 1913 to haul sugar beets from grower to processor.  The railroad was acquired in 1969 by the Pea Vine Corporation and today operates freight traffic through a connection with the San Luis and Rio Grande Railroad hauling mainly grain, potatoes and fertilizer. SLC is also a railcar owner, mostly refrigerator cars and boxcars.  

The railroad owns two locomotives: Electro Motive Division SW8 number 70 and General Electric 70 ton locomotive number 71. The company is owned by Rail World, Inc., which is controlled by Ed Burkhardt. Burkhardt is listed as president of SLC.

Headquarters
The company's headquarters is located at 2899 Sherman Avenue, Monte Vista, Colorado 81144, at coordinates

References

Colorado railroads
Railway companies established in 1913
1913 establishments in Colorado